Marc Fionn Woodard (born February 21, 1970) is a former American football linebacker who played three seasons in the National Football League (NFL) with the Philadelphia Eagles. He was drafted by the Pittsburgh Steelers in the fifth round of the 1993 NFL Draft. He played college football at Mississippi State University and attended Kosciusko High School in Kosciusko, Mississippi.

References

External links
Just Sports Stats

Living people
1970 births
Players of American football from Mississippi
American football linebackers
African-American players of American football
Mississippi State Bulldogs football players
Philadelphia Eagles players
People from Kosciusko, Mississippi
21st-century African-American sportspeople
20th-century African-American sportspeople